Kusal may refer to

 Kusal Goonewardena, Australian physical therapist and health lecturer

Kusal Mendis, Sri Lankan cricketer
Kusal Perera, Sri Lankan cricketer
Francišak Kušal, Belarusian army officer and politician.
Kusal Language, Spoken in Ghana
Kusal (2018 film), Sri Lankan film

Sinhalese masculine given names